Kingscote Park may refer to:
 Kingscote Park, Blackpool, a park in Blackpool, Lancashire, England
Kingscote Park (Gloucestershire), a house in Kingscote, near Tetbury, Gloucestershire, England